The Atlas bear or North African bear (Ursus arctos crowtheri) is an extinct population or populations of brown bear native to North Africa that became extinct in historical times.

Range and description 
The Atlas bear was Africa's only native bear species that survived into modern times. Once inhabiting the Atlas Mountains and neighbouring areas, from Morocco to Libya, the animal is now thought to be extinct. The Atlas bear was brownish-black in colour and lacked a white mark on the muzzle. The fur on the underparts was reddish-orange. The muzzle and claws were shorter than those of the American black bear, though it was stouter and thicker in body. It apparently fed on roots, acorns and nuts. The Atlas bear was said to have been mostly herbivorous, but since most bears today are omnivores, the Atlas bear is believed to have been able to eat meat as well. It was believed that, if it did eat meat, it probably ate small mammals as well as carrion while scavenging.

Genetics 
A mitochondrial DNA study of bones of Atlas bears ranging in age from 10,000 to 800 years BP found that the specimens belonged to two distinct clades, one, referred to as "Clade V", was indistinguishable from brown bears found in the Iberian Peninsula, while the other "Clade VI", was highly distinct from all other brown bears, either closely related to the polar bear and Alaskan brown bears or outside the group that contains all other brown bear mitochondrial lineages. Atlas bears appear to not be closely related to Middle Eastern brown bear populations, despite geographic proximity, which suggests that the colonisation of Africa by brown bears was an event of considerable antiquity.

Ecology 
The Atlas bear's ecology is presumed to be similar to that of the other brown bears. Sympatric predators included the Barbary leopard and Barbary lion.

Extinction 
The Atlas bear became extinct shortly after modern firearms were developed. Over-hunting may have contributed to their decline. Pressure from zoo collectors sealed their fate, with the animals being taken away from one another and unable to reproduce and flourish. The Atlas bear finally became extinct in the late 19th century; the last one recorded to be killed by hunters was in 1870 in the Tetouan Mountains in northern Morocco. Human activity can definitely be said to have played a large role in causing the extinction of the Atlas bear.

References 

 
 
 "Bears of the Last Frontier, Hour One: City of Bears: Brown Bear Fact Sheet". www.pbs.org. Web. 23 Oct. 2014.
 "The Animal Files". www.theanimalfiles.com. Web. 23 Oct. 2014.
 "Brown Bear- Ursus Arctos". The National Park Service. www.nps.gov. Web. 23 Oct. 2014.

External links 

 

Atlas bear
Mammals of North Africa
Extinct mammals of Africa
Extinct animals of Africa
Species made extinct by human activities
Mammal extinctions since 1500
Atlas bear
Species endangered by sport fishing and hunting